In journalism, a tick-tock is a type of story that focuses on chronological order of events.

References

 wordspy.com
 Benchmark and Timetable, William Safire May 27, 2007

Journalism terminology